Robert Higbee was an American Negro league outfielder in the 1900s and 1910s.

Higbee played for the Indianapolis ABCs for several seasons between 1908 and 1913. In 19 recorded games, he posted 15 hits in 75 plate appearances.

References

External links
Baseball statistics and player information from Baseball-Reference Black Baseball Stats and Seamheads

Year of birth missing
Year of death missing
Place of birth missing
Place of death missing
Indianapolis ABCs players
Baseball outfielders